Chalestra is a monotypic moth genus of the family Erebidae. Its only species, Chalestra podaresalis, is found in South Africa. Both the genus and species were first described by Francis Walker in 1859.

References

Endemic moths of South Africa
Calpinae
Monotypic moth genera